The Bureau of Customs Transformers was a professional women's volleyball team sponsored by Bureau of Customs that played in the Shakey's V-League.

Roster
2020 PSL Grand Prix Conference

Honors
Team:

Individual:

Imports

Team captains
 Alyssa Valdez (2016)

Coaches
 Sherwin Meneses (2016)

References

2016 establishments in the Philippines
Volleyball clubs established in 2016
Women's volleyball teams in the Philippines